Zeïni Moulaye (born 1954) is a Malian politician.  he serves as Minister of Foreign Affairs.

He previously served as Minister of Transport and Tourism from 1989 to 1991.

References 

Living people
1954 births
Place of birth missing (living people)
Foreign Ministers of Mali
Malian politicians
21st-century Malian people
20th-century Malian people